The twelfth season of the American comedy television series It's Always Sunny in Philadelphia premiered on FXX on January 4, 2017. The season consists of 10 episodes and concluded on March 8, 2017.

Cast

Main cast
 Charlie Day as Charlie Kelly
 Glenn Howerton as Dennis Reynolds
 Rob McElhenney as Mac
 Kaitlin Olson as Dee Reynolds
 Danny DeVito as Frank Reynolds

Recurring cast
 Mary Elizabeth Ellis as The Waitress
 David Hornsby as Cricket
Lance Barber as Bill Ponderosa
Lynne Marie Stewart as Mrs. Kelly
 Sandy Martin as Mrs. Mac
 Gregory Scott Cummins as Luther Mac
 Andrew Friedman as Jack Kelly
Chad L. Coleman as Z
Wil Garet as Old Black Man

Guest stars
Scott Bakula as himself
David Benioff as Bored Lifeguard #1
D. B. Weiss as Bored Lifeguard #2
Dana White as himself
Megan Olivi as herself
Donald Cerrone as himself
Paul Felder as himself
Robert Pine as Jack Mara
Renée Felice Smith as Belle
Christine Woods as Mandy

Production
The series was renewed for an eleventh and twelfth season on April 4, 2014, each to consist of 10 episodes. On December 15, 2016, Glenn Howerton revealed the season premiere would be a musical episode.

Episodes

Reception
The twelfth season received positive reviews. On Rotten Tomatoes, it has an approval rating of 90% with an average score of 8.6 out of 10 based on 21 reviews. The site's critical consensus reads, "Twelve seasons in and It's Always Sunny still shines bright thanks to its willingness to trod into new comedic territory and push the limits of its already limitless characters."

References

External links

 
 

It's Always Sunny in Philadelphia
2017 American television seasons